Childreach International (formerly Global Development Links) is a London based children's charity set up in 2003 and registered as a charity in 2004.

The charity operates multiple international projects and a UK outreach programme.

On January 31, 2018, Childreach International made an announcement to pause all of their operations due to financial difficulties.

References

External links
 Official Childreach International Website

Children's charities based in the United Kingdom
Development charities based in the United Kingdom